Ayoub Ouhafsa (born 14 November 1997) is a French professional footballer who plays as a forward for Swiss club Xamax.

Professional career
On 16 July 2019, Ouhafsa joined Rodez AF from Marseille II. He made his professional debut with Rodez in a 2–0 Ligue 2 win over AJ Auxerre on 26 July 2019, scoring in the first minute of the game.

On 25 June 2021, he signed a one-year contract with Xamax in Switzerland as a free agent.

Personal life
Born in France, Ouhafsa is of Moroccan descent.

References

External links
 
 
 FDB Profile

 

1993 births
Living people
People from Millau
Association football forwards
French footballers
French sportspeople of Moroccan descent
Rodez AF players
Neuchâtel Xamax FCS players
Ligue 2 players
Championnat National players
Championnat National 2 players
Swiss Challenge League players
French expatriate footballers
Expatriate footballers in Switzerland
French expatriate sportspeople in Switzerland
Sportspeople from Aveyron
Footballers from Occitania (administrative region)